Cœur-de-la-Vallée is a commune in the Marne department in north-eastern France. It was established as a commune nouvelle on 1 January 2023 from the merger of the communes of Binson-et-Orquigny, Reuil and Villers-sous-Châtillon.

See also
Communes of the Marne department

References

Coeurdelavallee